When the Night Calls is the second studio album by English alternative country duo Mt. Desolation. This is the second album by the side project of the band Keane's Tim Rice-Oxley and Jesse Quin.

Track listing 
 All tracks written by Tim Rice-Oxley and Jesse Quin

Personnel
Mt Desolation:

Tim Rice-Oxley - vocals, piano, synths, composition
Jesse Quin - vocals, lead guitar, composition

References

2018 albums
Mt. Desolation albums
Keane (band)